Gheorghe Rohat (born 23 January 1975, Ploieşti) is a former Romanian footballer.

Titles

External links
 
  

1975 births
Living people
Sportspeople from Ploiești
Romanian footballers
Association football defenders
Romanian expatriate sportspeople in Moldova
Liga I players
Liga II players
FC Astra Giurgiu players
FC Petrolul Ploiești players
FC Bihor Oradea players
FC Zimbru Chișinău players
ASC Oțelul Galați players
FC Argeș Pitești players
FC Unirea Urziceni players
Romanian expatriate footballers
Expatriate footballers in Moldova